is a Japanese television drama series premiered on Fuji TV from January 18, 2016, on Mondays at 21:00. It was written by Yūji Sakamoto starring Kasumi Arimura and Kengo Kora.

Synopsis
Love That Makes You Cry follows the story of love, friendship and growth of six young men and women who move from countryside to the big city of Tokyo, each with their own dreams and aspirations. Among them is Sugihara Oto and Soda Ren. After her mother died, Oto was raised by adoptive parents in Hokkaido. Although she has given up on having any high hopes or big dreams for her future, she still remains positive and faces life with optimistic attitude. One day, she finds out the fact that her adoptive parents are planning to marry her to the wealthy man in town in order to solve their financial debt. Soda Ren was raised by his grandfather in Fukushima. Ren works hard on one job after another in order to earn the money to buy back his grandfather's land so that they can start farming again. By chance, Oto and Ren meet in Hokkaido and they decide to move to Tokyo to find new life to change their fate and future. However, as soon as they arrive in Tokyo, they get separated in the crowds... -- Fuji TV

Cast
 Kasumi Arimura as Oto Sugihara
 Kengo Kora as Ren Soda
 Mitsuki Takahata as Kihoko Hinata
 Takahiro Nishijima (AAA) as Asahi Ibuki
 Aoi Morikawa as Konatsu Ichimura
 Kentaro Sakaguchi as Haruta Nakajo

Episodes

Reception
The first episode received the highest viewership rating of 11.6% in the Kantō region, and the average was 9.7%.

Recognitions

International adaptations
A Turkish remake called Aşk Ağlatır produced by Faruk Bayhan, debuted on September 8, 2019, on Show TV.

References

External links
  
 

Japanese drama television series
2016 Japanese television series debuts
2016 Japanese television series endings
Fuji TV dramas
Television shows written by Yûji Sakamoto